Our Journey… So Far is BarlowGirl's first compilation album and final release.

Track listing

Personnel 
Adapted from liner notes. Personnel listing for previously released songs is available in the liner of the respective albums.

Musicians
 Alyssa Barlow – vocals, bass and keyboards
 Lauren Barlow – vocals, drums
 Rebecca Barlow – vocals, guitars

Production
 Otto Price – executive producer, producer
 Maryann Barlow, Emily Gary, Leigh Holt, Josh Lauritch – executive producer (Our Journey… In Pictures)
 Fred Williams – remixer and programmer for "I Need You To Love Me (FredTown Manila Remix)"
 Katherine Petillo and Josh Lauritch – creative director
 Barlow family – photography
 Sarah Barlow – design and photography (Our Journey… In Pictures)
 Wayne Brezinka – design and collage illustration
 New International Version – Bible translation used in collage

References

External links
 Our Journey… So Far promotional bumpers from New Release Today

BarlowGirl albums
2010 greatest hits albums
Fervent Records albums